Roberto Sebastián Brum Gutiérrez (born 5 July 1983, in Montevideo) is a Uruguayan footballer currently playing for Cerro.

Career

Club
Brum's career started in Argentina with Talleres, before he moved to Uruguay to join Cerro. After 2 goals in 95 appearances over three years with the club, Brum departed to sign for Nacional. He played in 36 of the club's 2008–09 Uruguayan Primera División fixtures before leaving after a single season to return to Argentina to join Primera B Nacional's Olimpo. During his time with Olimpo, he won promotion to the Argentine Primera División after the club won the 2009–10 Primera B Nacional. Between 2011 and 2013, Brum played for Argentinos Juniors on loan and Banfield permanently. In the 2011–12 season, Brum played 13 times for Argentinos Juniors and 11 for Banfield. 22 appearances followed for Brum with Banfield in 2012–13.

August 2013 saw Brum depart Banfield as he agreed to sign for fellow Primera B Nacional side Patronato, in his debut season for Patronato he scored 3 goals in 36 appearances and picked up 15 yellow cards without getting sent off. 16 more league appearances came for Brum in 2014. In January 2015, Brum joined Argentine Primera División side Gimnasia y Esgrima. His debut came on 22 February against San Martín and he scored his first Gimnasia goal in November against the same opposition. On 7 July 2016, Brum completed a transfer to another Primera División team, Aldosivi.

Career statistics

Club
.

Honours

Club
Nacional
 Uruguayan Primera División (1): 2008–09

Olimpo
 Primera B Nacional (1): 2009–10

References

External links
 Profile at BDFA 
 

1983 births
Living people
Uruguayan people of Portuguese descent
Uruguayan footballers
Uruguayan expatriate footballers
Association football midfielders
Uruguayan Primera División players
Argentine Primera División players
Primera Nacional players
Talleres de Remedios de Escalada footballers
C.A. Cerro players
Club Nacional de Football players
Argentinos Juniors footballers
Olimpo footballers
Club Atlético Banfield footballers
Club Atlético Patronato footballers
Club de Gimnasia y Esgrima La Plata footballers
Aldosivi footballers
Club Atlético Temperley footballers
Atenas de San Carlos players
Expatriate footballers in Argentina
Uruguayan expatriate sportspeople in Argentina